Upright Mountain is located on the border of Alberta and British Columbia. It was named in 1911.

See also
 List of peaks on the Alberta–British Columbia border
 Mountains of Alberta
 Mountains of British Columbia

References

Upright Mountain
Upright Mountain
Canadian Rockies